Dasineura ulmariae is a species of fly in the family Cecidomyiidae found in the  Palearctic.  The larvae gall Apiaceae.

References

External links
 Images representing  Cecidomyiidae at BOLD

Cecidomyiinae
Gall-inducing insects
Insects described in 1847
Nematoceran flies of Europe
Taxa named by Johann Jacob Bremi-Wolf